Harvey Wade "Swede" Halbrook  (January 30, 1933 – April 5, 1988) was an American former National Basketball Association (NBA) player from 1960 to 1962.  He played in college for Oregon State University, and at 7 ft 3 in (2.21 m), was at the time the tallest player to ever play college and professional basketball.

High school career
Swede Halbrook played high school basketball at Lincoln High School in Portland, Oregon where he also starred in track as a high jumper and hurdler. Lincoln won the state tournament in Halbrook's senior year. In one tournament game, he scored 50 points and had 34 rebounds.

College career
When Halbrook joined the Oregon State Beavers, Life magazine declared him the "World's Tallest Basketball Player" in their January 18, 1954, issue. Under head coach Slats Gill, he instantly turned the team into a national title contender, earning All-American status in 1955 and All-Pacific Coast Conference first team and All-Northern Division first-team honors in 1954 and 1955, the only two seasons he played. As of 2006, he still holds the top three spots on Oregon State's single-game rebound records, his top performance of 36 being tied for 15th in NCAA history. He also holds the Oregon State record for free throws attempted at 28.

Professional career
Halbrook signed with the Wichita Vickers in 1956, where he played five seasons and led the team to the national AAU title in 1959. The next year, he was selected to play for the Syracuse Nationals.  He played in 79 games for them in the 1960–61 season, with his team making it to the NBA playoffs and finishing the season in third place.  Halbrook was a key presence in many of the Nationals' victories, including a 3-game series sweep over Wilt Chamberlain and the Philadelphia Warriors.  Syracuse coach Alex Hannum told an Oregonian reporter that "Wilt was really concerned with Swede...Wilt never had to look anyone in the eye and he would get more involved in trying to outplay Swede than he would in trying to win the game."

The following season, he played in 64 games for the Nationals, that season marking the end of his professional career.  He remained the tallest player in NBA history until the 1982 draft brought Mark Eaton and Chuck Nevitt into the league.

Personal life
Off-court issues cut short both Halbrook's college and professional careers.  He would reportedly go missing for days, sometimes weeks at a time without explanation.  Oregon State coach Gill was forced to cut him from the team after only two seasons for skipping class so often.  Nationals coach Hannum is quoted to have said that "He could have had a worthwhile career if he had taken care of himself.  During his second season, he disappeared for a week and we sent the police out to look for him. But they couldn’t find a 7-footer! He came back on his own but he never would tell me where he had been."

Swede moved to Portland, Oregon after being released from the Nationals and worked at a variety of odd jobs for the remainder of his life. In later life, he worked as a circus clown and was given the title of the "World's Tallest Clown". He died of a heart attack on April 5, 1988, on a Portland city bus.

See also
List of tallest players in National Basketball Association history
List of NCAA Division I men's basketball players with 30 or more rebounds in a game

References

External links 
 Database Basketball – Harvey Halbrook stats

1933 births
1988 deaths
Amateur Athletic Union men's basketball players
American men's basketball players
Basketball players from Portland, Oregon
Centers (basketball)
Lincoln High School (Portland, Oregon) alumni
Oregon State Beavers men's basketball players
Syracuse Nationals draft picks
Syracuse Nationals players